Ice River Glacier is located  northeast of Mount Olympus in the Olympic Mountains of Olympic National Park in the U.S. state of Washington. The glacier reaches as low as  before terminating. Though the glacier lies adjacent to the much larger Blue Glacier, an arête separates the two glaciers.

See also
List of glaciers in the United States

References

Glaciers of the Olympic Mountains
Glaciers of Jefferson County, Washington
Glaciers of Washington (state)